Pilgrims' Way (or Pilgrim's Way) may refer to:

Pilgrims' Way, an ancient trackway in southern England
Pilgrims Way (novel), a 1988 novel by Abdulrazak Gurnah
North Wales Pilgrims Way, a long-distance walking route ending at Bardsey Island
Pilgrims' Way, the ancient pedestrian route across tidal sands to Lindisfarne in north east England
Pilgrim's Way, the US title of John Buchan's autobiography Memory Hold-the-Door
Pilgrims' Way (band), an English folk band

See also 
 Pilgrims' way